The Heart of the Matter is a 1953 British drama film based on the 1948 book of the same name by Graham Greene. It was directed by George More O'Ferrall for London Films. It was entered into the 1953 Cannes Film Festival.

Cast and production
Trevor Howard plays Scobie, a senior policeman in British Sierra Leone. He is unhappily married to Louise, played by Elizabeth Allan. While she is away, he begins a love affair with Helen, played by Maria Schell. However, Scobie's Catholic faith leaves him tormented with guilt. The film also features Denholm Elliott, Peter Finch, Gérard Oury, George Coulouris and Michael Hordern.

It contains no original score, but instead features indigenous music from Sierra Leone in West Africa, where location filming took place. The interiors were filmed at Shepperton Studios in London. The film's sets were designed by the art director Joseph Bato. The black and white cinematography was by Jack Hildyard.

Plot
Scobie, Deputy Commissioner of the Sierra Leone Police in Freetown during the Second World War, is unhappily married to fellow-Catholic Louise: both mourn the death of their only daughter. Despite his having been a police officer in the country for 15 years, when the Police Commissioner announces he is to retire, Scobie is overlooked in favour of a younger man sent out from the UK.

On a search of a neutral Portuguese ship, the Esperança, he finds an envelope addressed to Germany. When he confiscates it, the captain begs him to do nothing because the letter is to his daughter. Feeling pity, Scobie burns it. His wife does not like the climate or the other expatriates and keeps begging him to let her go to South Africa by sea but they cannot afford the fare. Eventually he accepts a loan from Yusef, a suspected smuggler.

Called up country because a local District Commissioner is in trouble, he finds the man has committed suicide because of his debts. While he is there, survivors of a ship torpedoed by the Germans are brought ashore by the Vichy police of neighbouring French Guinea.  One is Helen, a young widow who reminds him of his dead daughter. Back in Freetown, he finds she has been given a hut near his house and, after he pays her a visit, they commence an affair. After an argument, he writes her a love letter but it is intercepted by a servant in Yusef's pay.

He learns that Louise is returning and Yusef tells him that he must give a packet of contraband diamonds to the captain of the Esperança or he will give his wife his letter to Helen. He complies. However, someone tells Louise about the affair.

Scobie is in torment between his love for Helen and his responsibilities to his wife, his wartime role and particularly his religious faith. He contemplates suicide but is then killed trying to stop a brawl.

Differences between film and book
The main difference between the film and the book is in the ending, which is almost equally bleak, but reversed from Greene's original story. In the book, Scobie's servant is killed (apparently an act of revenge by Yusef, here played by Gérard Oury). Scobie commits suicide. In the film, Scobie intends to kill himself, but is interrupted by a fight breaking out. He intervenes and is shot. The servant (Earl Cameron) does not die, but instead Scobie dies in his servant's arms.

Cast
Trevor Howard	as Harry Scobie
Elizabeth Allan 	as Louise Scobie
Maria Schell 	as Helen Rolt
Denholm Elliott 	as Wilson
Peter Finch 	as Father Rank
Gérard Oury 	as Yusef 
George Coulouris 	as Portuguese Captain
Michael Hordern 	as Commissioner
Peter Burton 	as Perrot 
Earl Cameron 	as Ali 
Judith Furse 	as Dr. Sykes 
Evelyn Roberts 	as Col. Wright 
Colin Gordon 	as Secretary
Orlando Martins 	as Rev. Clay 
Cyril Raymond 	as Carter
 Gillian Lind as Mrs Carter

References

External links
 
 Channel Four review

1953 films
British drama films
Films based on British novels
1953 drama films
London Films films
Films based on works by Graham Greene
Films directed by George More O'Ferrall
Films set in the British Empire
Films set in Africa
Films set in 1942
Films produced by Ian Dalrymple
Films with screenplays by Ian Dalrymple
Films shot in Sierra Leone
British black-and-white films
1950s English-language films
1950s British films